The Tropic of Cancer, which is also referred to as the Northern Tropic, is the most northerly circle of latitude on Earth at which the Sun can be directly overhead. This occurs on the June solstice, when the Northern Hemisphere is tilted toward the Sun to its maximum extent. It also reaches 90 degrees below the horizon at solar midnight on the December Solstice.

Its Southern Hemisphere counterpart, marking the most southerly position at which the Sun can be directly overhead, is the Tropic of Capricorn. These tropics are two of the five major circles of latitude that mark maps of Earth, the others being the Arctic and Antarctic circles and the Equator. The positions of these two circles of latitude (relative to the Equator) are dictated by the tilt of Earth's axis of rotation relative to the plane of its orbit, and since the tilt changes, the location of these two circles also changes.

In geopolitics, it is known for being the southern limitation on the mutual defence obligation of NATO, as member states of NATO are not obligated to come to the defence of territory south of the Tropic of Cancer.

Name
When this line of latitude was named in the last centuries BCE, the Sun was in the constellation Cancer (Latin for crab) at the June solstice, the time each year that the Sun reaches its zenith at this latitude. Due to the precession of the equinoxes, this is no longer the case; today the Sun is in Gemini at the June solstice. The word "tropic" itself comes from the Greek "trope (τροπή)", meaning turn (change of direction, or circumstances), inclination, referring to the fact that the Sun appears to "turn back" at the solstices.

Drift

The Tropic of Cancer's position is not fixed, but constantly changes because of a slight wobble in the Earth's longitudinal alignment relative to the ecliptic, the plane in which the Earth orbits around the Sun. The circle's position was at exactly 23° 27′N in 1917 and will be at 23° 26'N in 2045. The distance between the Antarctic Circle and the Tropic of Cancer is essentially constant as they move in tandem. This is based on an assumption of a constant equator, but the precise location of the equator is not truly fixed. See: equator, axial tilt and circles of latitude for additional details.

Geography

North of the tropic are the subtropics and the North Temperate Zone. The equivalent line of latitude south of the Equator is called the Tropic of Capricorn, and the region between the two, centered on the Equator, is the tropics.

In the year 2000, more than half of the world's population lived north of the Tropic of Cancer.

There are approximately 13 hours, 35 minutes of daylight during the summer solstice. During the winter solstice, there are 10 hours, 41 minutes of daylight.

Using 23°26'N for the Tropic of Cancer, the tropic passes through the following countries and territories starting at the prime meridian and heading eastward:

Climate
The climate at the Tropic of Cancer is generally hot and dry, except for cooler highland regions in China, marine environments such as Hawaii, and easterly coastal areas, where orographic rainfall can be very heavy, in some places reaching  annually. Much land on or near the Tropic of Cancer is part of the Sahara Desert, while to the east, the climate is torrid monsoonal with a short wet season from June to September, and very little rainfall for the rest of the year.

The highest mountain on or adjacent to the Tropic of Cancer is Yu Shan in Taiwan; though it had glaciers descending as low as  during the Last Glacial Maximum, none survive and at present no glaciers exist within  of the Tropic of Cancer; the nearest currently surviving are the Minyong and Baishui in the Himalayas to the north and on Iztaccíhuatl to the south.

Circumnavigation
According to the rules of the Fédération Aéronautique Internationale, for a flight to compete for a round-the-world speed record, it must cover a distance no less than the length of the Tropic of Cancer, cross all meridians, and end on the same airfield where it started.

Length of the Tropic of Cancer is :

For an ordinary circumnavigation the rules are somewhat relaxed and the distance is set to a rounded value of at least .

Gallery

See also 

Circle of latitude
Arctic Circle
24th parallel north
23rd parallel north
Equator
Tropic of Capricorn
Antarctic Circle
Axial tilt
Milankovitch cycles

References

External links 

Temporal Epoch Calculations
Useful constants See: Obliquity of the ecliptic

N23
Tropics